Eko Putro Sandjojo (born May 21, 1965 in Jakarta) is an Indonesian politician. He was the Minister of Villages, Development of Disadvantaged Regions, and Transmigration in the Working Cabinet in Indonesia. He was appointed Minister on July 27, 2016 by Joko Widodo and until on October 20, 2019.

He is a graduate from the Jakarta State Polytechnic. Sandjojo holds a degree in Electrical engineering from the University of Kentucky which he obtained in 1991. In 1993, he also obtained a Masters from the Indonesia Institute for Management Development IPMI Business School.

In July 2016, he was appointed Minister of Villages, Disadvantaged Regions and Transmigration by President Joko Widodo.

References 

Living people
1965 births
People from Jakarta
University of Kentucky alumni
Government ministers of Indonesia
Working Cabinet (Joko Widodo)